Morris G. Steen Jr. is an American academic, and the former President of North Florida Community College. Steen graduated with his bachelor's degree in Agricultural Economics from the University of Florida in 1965. He received his master's degree from George Washington University in Administration in 1977.  In addition he completed an Academic Leadership Program at the University of Florida in 1999. In 2002 he was selected to be President of North Florida Community College.  Prior to this position, Steen served in the United States Navy, where he earned the rank of captain.

See also
 North Florida Community College
 Florida Community Colleges System

References

External links
 Steen's official bio
 Info about Steen
 Another biography
 DOE info about appointment

Living people
Educators from Florida
University of Florida alumni
George Washington University alumni
Year of birth missing (living people)